Hans-Otto Woellke (18 February 1911 – 22 March 1943) was a German shot putter, who won a gold medal at the 1936 Summer Olympics and a bronze medal at the 1938 European Championships.

Woellke served with the Order Police. During World War II, he was a captain in the Schutzmannschaft Battalion 118 attached to a regiment in the Waffen-SS. He was killed by partisans on 22 March 1943 near Khatyn village, after which a retaliatory mass killing of civilians took place by Schutzmannschaft and Waffen-SS soldiers.

References

1911 births
1943 deaths
People from Biskupiec
People from East Prussia
German male shot putters
Olympic gold medalists for Germany
Athletes (track and field) at the 1936 Summer Olympics
Olympic athletes of Germany
German military personnel killed in World War II
Sportspeople from Warmian-Masurian Voivodeship
European Athletics Championships medalists
Medalists at the 1936 Summer Olympics
Olympic gold medalists in athletics (track and field)
SS-Hauptsturmführer
Deaths by firearm in the Soviet Union
Deaths by firearm in Belarus
Reich Security Main Office personnel